Aenictus currax is a species of dark brown army ant found on New Guinea. A colony of 100,000+ was chronicled on New Guinea in Karema, PNG. The ants form new colonies through fission.

References

Dorylinae
Hymenoptera of Oceania
Insects described in 1900